Lyme-Old Lyme High School is a public high school in Old Lyme, Connecticut. It serves grades 9 through 12 and is the only high school operated by Lyme-Old Lyme Schools.

History
A successful 2009 referendum cleared the way for a 15,000-square foot expansion of the school that wrapped up in 2013.

Athletics
LOLHS athletic teams are nicknamed the Wildcats and compete in the Shoreline Conference. The school fields a co-op football team with Valley Regional High School, nicknamed the Warriors. In 2019, the

Performing arts
Lyme-Old Lyme has a competitive show choir, "Amped Up!".

Robotics
Lyme-Old Lyme High School's FIRST Robotics Competition Team 236, "The Techno-Ticks", won the Championship Chairman's Award in 2009.

Notable faculty
 Jim Calhoun, basketball coach

References

External links
 

Old Lyme, Connecticut
Schools in New London County, Connecticut
Public high schools in Connecticut